Ingrid Marie Vila Biaggi is a civil and environmental engineer and former Puerto Rico Chief of Staff. Previous to her position as Chief of Staff, Vila served as Deputy Chief of Staff for the governorship of Sila Maria Calderón from 2001 to 2005. She holds a bachelor's degree in civil and environmental engineering from Cornell University, and a master's degree in the same field from Stanford University. In her private life Vila has offered consulting services in project management to the Puerto Rico Aqueducts and Sewers Authority.

Personal life
Vila Biaggi is the daughter of Ingrid Arlene Biaggi and Enrique Vila del Corral, a certified public accountant. She married Luis Enrique Rodríguez, a professor of law at the University of Puerto Rico School of Law and former Secretary of Natural and Environmental Resources, in 2002. They have two daughters, Ingrid Elisse (born in 2004) and Lauren Marie (born in 2008).

Notes

References

Chiefs of Staff of Puerto Rico
Cornell University College of Engineering alumni
Members of the 16th Cabinet of Puerto Rico
Living people
1974 births